Hub Tehsil is located in Hub District, Balochistan, Pakistan.

The tehsil is administratively subdivided into seven Union Councils and is headquartered at the city of Hub.

History 
Hub Tehsil was previously part of Lasbela District.

See also 
 Sonmiani
 Somiani Spaceport
 Sonmiani Beach
 Lasbela District
 Hub, Balochistan
 Hub Industrial and Trading Estate

References

Tehsils of Lasbela District